Alan Connor (born 1972) is a British writer, journalist and television presenter. First seen on Channel 4's youth entertainment programme The Word in 1995, he later appeared on The Big Breakfast and BBC Radio Five Live and was a BBC News correspondent, appearing on BBC News 24 and The Daily Politics.

His scriptwriting credits include the comedy-drama A Young Doctor's Notebook, starring Daniel Radcliffe and Jon Hamm, the mockumentary Nigel Farage Gets His Life Back and the BBC film The Rack Pack.

Connor has worked as a writer for programmes including Charlie Brooker's Weekly Wipe, The Jonathan Ross Show and This Week and writes journalism for BBC News and The Guardian. He was the question editor for BBC Four's lateral thinking quiz Only Connect for series 9–12, having taken over from David J. Bodycombe at the start of series 9.

Books
In 2013 Penguin published Two Girls, One on Each Knee: A History of Cryptic Crosswords. In 2014 Gotham Books published The Crossword Century: 100 Years of Witty Wordplay, Ingenious Puzzles, and Linguistic Mischief. In 2016 Penguin Books published The Joy of Quiz.

References

External links

Living people
British comedy writers
British male journalists
British television writers
Scottish journalists
Alumni of Wadham College, Oxford
1974 births
Date of birth missing (living people)
Place of birth missing (living people)
British male television writers